Tiago Alexandre Mendes Alves (born 19 June 1996) is a Portuguese footballer who plays for Japanese J2 League club Montedio Yamagata, as a forward.

Club career
On 31 July 2016, Alves made his professional debut with Varzim in a 2016–17 Taça da Liga match against Olhanense.

References

External links

Stats and profile at LPFP 

1996 births
Living people
Sportspeople from Coimbra
Portuguese footballers
Portuguese expatriate footballers
Association football forwards
Varzim S.C. players
S.C. Salgueiros players
Olimpia Grudziądz players
Piast Gliwice players
Montedio Yamagata players
Campeonato de Portugal (league) players
Liga Portugal 2 players
Segunda Divisão players
I liga players
II liga players
Ekstraklasa players
Expatriate footballers in Poland
Portuguese expatriate sportspeople in Poland
Expatriate footballers in Japan
Portuguese expatriate sportspeople in Japan